Anthony Earl Oden (born June 30, 1973) is an American football coach and former player who is the senior defensive assistant and cornerbacks coach for the New York Jets of the National Football League (NFL). He previously served as an assistant coach for the San Francisco 49ers, Miami Dolphins, Detroit Lions, Tampa Bay Buccaneers, Jacksonville Jaguars, New Orleans Saints and Houston Texans. Oden played college football at Baldwin–Wallace College.

Early life
Oden was born in Cleveland, Ohio and is a native of Cleveland Heights, Ohio. He played as an outside linebacker at Baldwin–Wallace College in the early 1990s.

NFL Coaching career

Houston Texans
In 2004, Oden got his first NFL coaching job with the Houston Texans as a defensive assistant coach.

New Orleans Saints
In 2006, Oden was hired as assistant secondary coach by the New Orleans Saints, spending five seasons in that capacity. Head coach Sean Payton promoted him to the role of secondary coach following the 2010 season.

Jacksonville Jaguars
On January 19, 2012, Oden was hired by the Jacksonville Jaguars as their defensive backs coach.

Tampa Bay Buccaneers
In 2013, Oden was hired by the Tampa Bay Buccaneers as their secondary and cornerbacks coach. He was let go after the season.

Detroit Lions
In 2014, Oden was hired by the Detroit Lions as their defensive backs coach.

Miami Dolphins
In 2018, Oden was hired by the Miami Dolphins as their defensive backs coach under head coach Adam Gase. Following the firing of Gase in 2019, the Dolphins announced on February 8, 2019 that they had retained Oden as their safeties coach under new head coach Brian Flores.

San Francisco 49ers
On February 10, 2020, Oden was hired by the San Francisco 49ers as their defensive backs coach under defensive coordinator Robert Saleh, whom he had previously worked with in Houston, and head coach Kyle Shanahan. He replaced Joe Woods, who left to become the defensive coordinator for the Cleveland Browns.

New York Jets 
On February 2, 2021, Oden was hired by the New York Jets as their senior defensive assistant and the team's cornerbacks coach.

References

External links
 Jacksonville Jaguars bio

1973 births
Living people
American football linebackers
Army Black Knights football coaches
Baldwin Wallace Yellow Jackets football players
Boston College Eagles football coaches
East Carolina Pirates football coaches
Eastern Michigan Eagles football coaches
Houston Texans coaches
Jacksonville Jaguars coaches
Millersville Marauders football coaches
New Orleans Saints coaches
People from Cleveland Heights, Ohio
Players of American football from Ohio 
San Francisco 49ers coaches
Sportspeople from Cuyahoga County, Ohio
Miami Dolphins coaches
Tampa Bay Buccaneers coaches
New York Jets coaches